Michael Donald Guman (born April 21, 1958) is a former professional football player with the Los Angeles Rams (1980–1988).

Guman was a star running back at Bethlehem Catholic High School (where he was a high school teammate of future NFLer John Spagnola). He went on to star at Penn State University. He is well remembered by college football fans for being on the receiving end of a goal line hit by University of Alabama linebacker Barry Krauss, in the Sugar Bowl on January 1, 1979, (ranked the Greatest Bowl Game Ever by ESPN in 2002) determining the NCAA national football champion.  The hit was featured on the cover of Sports Illustrated the following week, and the accompanying article reported the collision had knocked the rivets on Krauss' helmet loose.  Fans still send the cover or prints of the photo to Guman to autograph. ESPN.com selected the play as #6 on their list of "100 Moments That Define College Football." 

Guman was drafted by the defending NFC Champions Los Angeles Rams in the 6th round (154th overall) of the 1980 NFL draft, on April 30, 1980.  His best season was 1981, during which, he rushed for 433 yards and 4 touchdowns, and had 18 catches for 130 yards. He was used mostly as a blocking fullback after the Rams drafted Eric Dickerson in 1983, a position he held for the rest of his career with the team.

Personal life
Guman retired from football after the 1988 season. He currently resides in Allentown, Pennsylvania with his wife, Karen. They have five children, 4 of whom also attended Penn State. Guman's son Andrew was an Academic All-American football player at Penn State, under the same coach, Joe Paterno.

He is currently a Senior Advisor Consultant for Invesco. He still lends his name and image to local restaurants and non-profit groups in the Lehigh Valley area of Pennsylvania.

Sources 
"A memory, both good and bad, for Mike Guman", The Morning Call.
Ain't Nothin' But a Winner, Barry Krauss's book on Amazon.com
Mike Guman at St. Louis Rams 1980s draft choices.
Mike Guman on pro-football-reference.com.

External links 
Mike Guman and Alabama's goal line stance against Penn State, YouTube.
ESPN's "100 Moments That Define College Football", #6 Collision Course

1958 births
Living people
Players of American football from Pennsylvania
Bethlehem Catholic High School alumni
Los Angeles Rams players
Penn State Nittany Lions football players
Sportspeople from Bethlehem, Pennsylvania
American football running backs
National Football League replacement players
Ed Block Courage Award recipients